Fox, also known as Blue and Black Fox or Blue Fox, is an oil on canvas painting by Franz Marc, from 1911. It is part of the collection of the Von der Heydt Museum in Wuppertal.

Description
The painting depicts in the central position, a fox turned to the left, lying on the ground, under a tree, in a relaxed, half-curled pose. A tree trunk and some leaves are indicated on the right side of the painting. The strong coloring of the background as an abstract landscape with strong complementary contrasts of blue / yellow and orange / red / green is reminiscent of the after-effects of French Fauvism and its color conception on German Expressionism.

In the period before the First World War, Marc often painted foxes. Among them is the painting The Foxes (1913), in the Museum Kunstpalast in Düsseldorf, in a Cubist inspired style, in which he had further developed abstraction compared to earlier works.

Origin and classification
The painting was created in July 1911 in fellow painter August Macke's studio in Bonn, when Marc was returning from a trip to England. A few months later, on December 18, 1911, the exhibition group Der Blaue Reiter, founded by Franz Marc and Wassily Kandinsky, had its first exhibition, in Munich. Marc quickly created Fox, together with the work Red Dog. The Fox was offered to the curator of the Barmer Kunstverein, Richart Reiche, who was exhibiting Marc's works. Reiche was able to find a buyer for the Red Dog. These two paintings belong to his early group of animal representations in which pure colors were used, in the function of symbols or the so-called essential colors. With the colors red / yellow / blue (primary colors) and orange / green / violet (secondary colors), Marc used the system of spectral colors as a basis in this painting.

The Fox is an example often used to illustrate the color contrasts.

Provenance
The work came into the possession of the Von der Heydt Museum in 1952 through a donation by Eduard von der Heydt from a collection that his father August von der Heydt had started.

See also
List of works by Franz Marc

References

External links
 

1911 paintings
Paintings by Franz Marc
Foxes in art